Today Is the Day is an American noise rock and experimental metal band that originally formed in Nashville, Tennessee, and is currently based in Orland, Maine. The band's discography includes eleven studio albums, two compilation albums, five split releases, a demo EP, various singles, and numerous live / video releases.

Albums

Studio albums

Live albums

Compilation albums

Extended plays

Singles

Other appearances

Videography

Video albums

Music videos

Other appearances

See also
Amphetamine Reptile Records discography
SuperNova Records discography
The End Records discography

References

External links
 Today Is the Day discography on Discogs
 Today Is the Day on Bandcamp
 

Today Is the Day albums
Heavy metal group discographies
Discographies of American artists